Bolusafra is a genus of flowering plants in the legume family, Fabaceae. It is monotypic, being represented by the single species Bolusafra bituminosa or tar pea.

References

Phaseoleae
Monotypic Fabaceae genera